Newton South High School is one of two public high schools in the city of Newton, Massachusetts, United States, the other being Newton North.

History and student life
By the late 1950s, Newton's sole public high school, Newton High, grew to 3,000 students. Newton built a new school, Newton South, in the Oak Hill neighborhood in 1960. The school is organized into four student houses—Cutler, Goldrick, Goodwin, and Wheeler—each with a student commons.

Newton South was the first public high school to create a gay–straight alliance in the United States in the early 1990s.

Newton South features two award-winning student newspapers, Denebola and The Lion's Roar.

U.S. News & World Report ranked Newton South as the 664th-best high school in the country and 20th-best in the Massachusetts in its 2020 rankings.

The school is part of the Newton Public School District.

Public attention
The school gained notoriety in 2002 for its "Senior Scavenger Hunt", a student-organized contest that featured theft, vandalism, illegal drug use, and various sexual acts committed by the graduating seniors in exchange for points.

On February 8, 2007, the Newton South STAND: A Student Anti-Genocide Coalition chapter organized a Darfur Benefit Concert with the well known band, State Radio, raising over $23,000 for Save the Children and the Genocide Intervention Network.

Sports
Newton South competes in the DCL (Dual County League).

Fall sports
Football (B)
Soccer (B+G)
Cross Country (B+G)
Volleyball (G)
Golf (Co-Ed)
Field Hockey (Co-Ed)
Cheerleading (Co-Ed)
Winter sports
Basketball (B+G)
Gymnastics (B+G)
Nordic Skiing (B+G)
Alpine Skiing (B+G)
Indoor Track and Field (B+G)
Wrestling (B+G)
Hockey (B+G)
Swimming and Diving (B+G)
Cheerleading (Co-Ed)
Spring sports
Lacrosse (B+G)
Baseball (B)
Softball (G)
Volleyball (B)
Track and Field (B+G)
Tennis (B+G)
Rugby (B+G)

Awards and recognition
Newton South was named Massachusetts's top athletic program by Sports Illustrated in 2009.

Notable alumni

 Josh Altman, class of 1997, real estate agent on Million Dollar Listing Los Angeles
 Nili Brosh, Israeli-American guitarist and songwriter
 Marisa Catalina Casey, class of 1997, co-author of Born in Our Hearts: Stories of Adoption, is the founder and executive director of the arts education nonprofit Starting Artists, Inc. located in Brooklyn
 Geoffrey Gray, class of 2015, American-Israeli professional basketball player in the Israeli Basketball Premier League
 Marin Hinkle, class of 1984, actor for Amazon's The Marvelous Mrs. Maisel and CBS's Two and a Half Men
 Alex Karpovsky, class of 1993, actor for HBO's comedy-drama Girls and Amazon's Homecoming
 Caroline Kaufer, class of 1980, software executive and philanthropist
 John Krasinski, class of 1997, filmmaker and actor for NBC's comedy The Office, A Quiet Place, and A Quiet Place Part II
 Ben Kurland, class of 2002, an actor in The Artist, which won five Academy Awards
 Bill Lichtenstein, class of 1974, Peabody Award-winning journalist, filmmaker, radio producer
 Robert C. Lieberman, class of 1982, American political scientist and former provost of the Johns Hopkins University
 Jonathan Mann, class of 1965, World Health Organization chief against AIDS
 Chris Morocco, class of 1998, American chef and YouTube personality
 Roger Myerson, class of 1969, was one of the three recipients of the Nobel Prize in Economics in 2007 "for having laid the foundations of mechanism design theory"
 Hari Nef, class of 2011, transgender actress, model, and writer. Debuted at New York Fashion Week Spring 2015
 B. J. Novak, class of 1997, co-executive producer, writer, and actor for NBC's comedy The Office
 Joe Rogan, class of 1985, TV host of Fear Factor, The Man Show, Joe Rogan Questions Everything, The Joe Rogan Experience podcast
 Eli Roth, class of 1990, film director, producer, writer, and actor. Co-starred with Novak in Inglourious Basterds
 Jason Solowsky, class of 1995, film composer, guitarist and pianist. Composed music for over 100 films.

References

External links

Schools in Newton, Massachusetts
Educational institutions established in 1960
Public high schools in Massachusetts
1960 establishments in Massachusetts